This list of bridges in the Czech Republic lists bridges of particular historical, scenic, architectural or engineering interest. Road and railway bridges, viaducts, aqueducts and footbridges are included.

Historical and architectural interest bridges

Major road and railway bridges 
This table presents the structures with spans greater than 100 meters (non-exhaustive list).

Notes and references 
 

 

 

 Others references

See also 

 :cs:Seznam nejdelších mostů v Česku  - List of the longest bridges in the Czech Republic
 :cs:Seznam mostů přes Vltavu  - List of bridges over the Vltava
 :cs:Seznam mostů přes Blanici  - List of bridges over Blanica
 Transport in the Czech Republic
 Highways in the Czech Republic
 Rail transport in the Czech Republic
 Geography of Czech Republic

External links

Further reading 
 

Czech Republic
 
Bridges
Bridges